Kelli Berglund (born February 9, 1996) is an American actress. She is known for portraying Bree Davenport in the Disney XD series Lab Rats, and its spinoff Lab Rats: Elite Force. In 2014 she starred in the Disney Channel Original Movie How to Build a Better Boy, where she portrays Mae Hartley. Berglund starred as Carly Carson in the 2019 Starz television drama series Now Apocalypse. She has also played the lead in two sports-themed films set in Australia, 2016's Raising the Bar and 2018's Going for Gold. She stars as Crystal in the 2021 Starz drama television series Heels.

Career

Berglund began her career at a young age as a series regular on TLC's Hip Hop Harry. TV appearances also include Are You Smarter Than a 5th Grader, and America's Next Producer. Berglund also appeared in the indie film, Bye Bye Benjamin. Her commercial credits include campaigns for Old Navy, Hyundai, Bratz, McDonald's and Mattel, among others. She has also appeared in print and modeling campaigns for Reebok and the Camarillo Academy of Performing Arts. Berglund has been honored with many awards in dance for her lyrical contemporary and jazz. Though she is equally versatile in these types of dance, her favorite style is contemporary — a blend of ballet and jazz.

From 2012 to 2016, Berglund starred as Bree, an overly outgoing, bionic super-human with super speed, in the Disney XD live-action comedy series Lab Rats alongside co-stars Tyrel Jackson Williams, Billy Unger, and Spencer Boldman. She continued to play Bree on Lab Rats 2016 spinoff series Lab Rats: Elite Force.

In 2013, Berglund guest starred on the Disney XD series Kickin' It, where she played karate prodigy Sloane Jennings. In this episode, her character sings "Had Me @ Hello" as a duet with Kim Crawford, played by Olivia Holt. In mid-2013, Berglund began work on the 2013 Disney Channel Original Movie, How to Build a Better Boy, in which she stars as Mae Hartley, a tech-savvy young woman who along with her best friend, devises a plan to create the perfect boyfriend. She sings "Something Real" with China Anne McClain which was released on July 29, 2014.

In 2016, Berglund co-starred in the NBC television film, Dolly Parton's Christmas of Many Colors: Circle of Love, playing the role of Willadeene Parton, Dolly Parton's older sister. The same year, she starred in the film Raising the Bar, in which she plays a former gymnast who gets back into the sport after relocating to Australia. In 2018, Berglund starred in Going for Gold, a film about cheerleading, set in Adelaide, Australia.

In June 2018, Berglund was cast in the starring role of Carly in the 2019 Starz television series Now Apocalypse. In 2019, Berglund was cast in the recurring role of Olivia in the fourth season of the drama television series Animal Kingdom. Berglund also had a minor role as a teen in a Billie Eilish costume in the 2020 Netflix comedy film Hubie Halloween.

Personal life
Berglund was born and raised in Moorpark, California, where she continues to live with her parents, Mark and Michelle Berglund, and younger sister, Kirra. She is a graduate of Moorpark High School's independent study program. In her spare time, she enjoys swimming and photography.

Filmography

References

External links

 
  

1996 births
21st-century American actresses
Actresses from California
American child actresses
American television actresses
Living people
People from Moorpark, California